Dirk Reichardt (born September 9, 1964) is a German composer, sound designer and jingle producer.

Early life
Dirk Reichardt discovered his love of the piano at a very early age. After many years of private instruction, teaching himself the drums and a number of early band projects, Reichardt finished secondary school in 1985 in Kiel (Germany). Later, while studying business administration in London, he worked as a keyboardist and assistant in a recording studio.

Career
In 1987, he took his first full-time studio job as an arranger in Hamburg. As a studio keyboardist, he has worked with a variety of artists including Dieter Bohlen, Blue System, Bonnie Tyler, Dionne Warwick, Roy Black, Fun Factory, and Nana, and has co-produced with Danny Shogger and David Parker (Taco). At the same time, he worked as an independent producer for radio stations in Germany and throughout Europe. In 1998 Dirk Reichardt founded the music production company jamXmusic gmbh, with whom he has produced over 100 jingle packages produced for 75 radio stations in Europe and the USA. jamXmusic is one of the most successful German music production companies in this market. In 2004 Dirk Reichardt drew a new type of attention to himself - this time as a composer. Alongside his co-composers Stefan Hansen and Max Berghaus, Reichardt was awarded with the German Film Prize (Gold) for the best film score for the soundtrack to Erbsen auf halb 6.

Since then, a close collaboration has developed with Til Schweiger, for whom Reichardt has contributed the soundtracks to the film hits Barfuss, Keinohrhasen and Zweiohrküken. The soundtrack for Keinohrhasen was the only German film soundtrack to reach platinum, with more than 200,000 copies sold in Germany. Reichhardt’s most popular works include “A Rainy Day in Vancouver” and “Emma/Leila’s Theme”, written for piano.

In 2010, Dirk Reichardt and Til Schweiger founded their own record label barefoot music for the release of future film soundtracks, and a growing catalog of solo artists.

Filmography

External links
  jamxmusic company
  Book Filmmusik-Bekenntnisse|}

1964 births
German composers
Living people